NGFAC are a planned Fast Attack Craft for the Indian Navy.Under this programme the Indian Navy intends to acquire seven advanced ships. Ships under this class will feature advanced stealth features like a low radar cross section (RCS), infrared, acoustic and magnetic signatures

References 

 
Ships of the Indian Navy